Košice is a municipality and village in Kutná Hora District in the Central Bohemian Region of the Czech Republic. It has about 60 inhabitants.

History
The first written mention of Košice is from 1310.

References

Villages in Kutná Hora District